Rochester Junction station was a Lehigh Valley Railroad station in Mendon, New York. The station was at the junction of the Lehigh Valley's main line and its Rochester Branch, which provided access to Rochester,  to the north.

The station opened in 1892. This original building remained in use for four years until it was replaced by a larger structure. The Lehigh Valley disassembled the first station and moved it to Lima, New York.

Buses replaced trains over the Rochester Branch on September 6, 1950. Rochester Junction was one of many stations which lost its passenger service on May 12, 1959, when the Lehigh Valley eliminated 60% of its remaining passenger trains, including all but one round-trip west of Lehighton, Pennsylvania. The Lehigh Valley continued to use the building for storage until a fire destroyed it on April 22, 1973. A local Boy Scout troop constructed a replica of the freight house on the former station site in 2013.

Notes

References 
 
 
 
 

Buildings and structures in Monroe County, New York
Former Lehigh Valley Railroad stations
Railway stations in the United States opened in 1892
Railway stations closed in 1959
Demolished railway stations in the United States
Former railway stations in New York (state)
1892 establishments in New York (state)
1959 disestablishments in New York (state)